Kechi  is a city in Sedgwick County, Kansas, United States, and a suburb of Wichita.  As of the 2020 census, the population of the city was 2,217.

History

19th century

Kechi was named for the Kichai people.

In 1887, the Chicago, Kansas and Nebraska Railway built a branch line north-south from Herington through Kechi to Caldwell.  It foreclosed in 1891 and was taken over by Chicago, Rock Island and Pacific Railway, which shut down in 1980 and reorganized as Oklahoma, Kansas and Texas Railroad, merged in 1988 with Missouri Pacific Railroad, merged in 1997 with Union Pacific Railroad.  Most locals still refer to this railroad as the "Rock Island".

The first post office in Kechi was established in 1888.

Geography
Kechi is located at  (37.795228, -97.278660).

Demographics

Kechi is part of the Wichita, KS Metropolitan Statistical Area.

2010 census
As of the census of 2010, there were 1,909 people, 701 households, and 566 families living in the city. The racial makeup of the city was 87.7% White, 5.5% African American, 0.9% Native American, 2.0% Asian, 1.2% from other races, and 2.8% from two or more races. Hispanic or Latino of any race were 3.1% of the population.

There were 701 households, of which 33.2% had children under the age of 18 living with them, 73.0% were married couples living together, 5.6% had a female householder with no husband present, 2.1% had a male householder with no wife present, and 19.3% were non-families. 15.5% of all households were made up of individuals, and 4.6% had someone living alone who was 65 years of age or older. The average household size was 2.72 and the average family size was 3.06.

The median age in the city was 42.6 years. 24.6% of residents were under the age of 18; 6.1% were between the ages of 18 and 24; 22.7% were from 25 to 44; 36% were from 45 to 64; and 10.7% were 65 years of age or older. The gender makeup of the city was 49.7% male and 50.3% female.

2000 census
As of the census of 2000, there were 1,038 people, 354 households, and 301 families living in the city. The racial makeup of the city was 87.67% White, 7.71% African American, 0.67% Native American, 0.58% Asian, 0.10% Pacific Islander, 0.19% from other races, and 3.08% from two or more races. Hispanic or Latino of any race were 2.12% of the population.

There were 354 households, out of which 45.8% had children under the age of 18 living with them, 77.4% were married couples living together, 5.4% had a female householder with no husband present, and 14.7% were non-families. 12.1% of all households were made up of individuals, and 2.3% had someone living alone who was 65 years of age or older. The average household size was 2.93 and the average family size was 3.19.

In the city, the population was spread out, with 31.1% under the age of 18, 6.3% from 18 to 24, 35.8% from 25 to 44, 22.2% from 45 to 64, and 4.6% who were 65 years of age or older. The median age was 33 years. For every 100 females, there were 100.0 males. For every 100 females age 18 and over, there were 98.1 males.

The median income for a household in the city was $61,333, and the median income for a family was $62,212. Males had a median income of $43,393 versus $28,077 for females. The per capita income for the city was $22,444. About 2.5% of families and 2.5% of the population were below the poverty line, including 4.4% of those under age 18 and 4.7% of those age 65 or over.

Education
The city is served by Wichita USD 259 and Valley Center USD 262 public school districts.

References

Further reading

External links

 City of Kechi
 Kechi - Directory of Public Officials
 Kechi city map, KDOT

Cities in Kansas
Cities in Sedgwick County, Kansas
Wichita, KS Metropolitan Statistical Area